Ranger of Cherokee Strip is a 1949 American Western film directed by Philip Ford and written by Robert Creighton Williams. The film stars Monte Hale, Paul Hurst, Alix Talton, Roy Barcroft, Douglas Kennedy and George Meeker. The film was released on November 4, 1949, by Republic Pictures.

Plot

Cast     
Monte Hale as Steve Howard
Paul Hurst as Sheriff Jug Mason
Alix Talton as Mary Bluebird 
Roy Barcroft as Mark Sanders
Douglas Kennedy as Joe Bearclaws
George Meeker as Eric Parsons
Frank Fenton as McKinnon
Monte Blue as Chief Hunter
Neyle Morrow as Tokata
Arthur Walsh as Will Rogers

References

External links 
 

1949 films
American Western (genre) films
1949 Western (genre) films
Republic Pictures films
Films directed by Philip Ford
American black-and-white films
1940s English-language films
1940s American films